April Lerman (born February 6, 1969) is an American former actress, singer, and counselor who played the role of Kate, an orphan in the 1982 film of the musical Annie. She also was a regular cast member on the first season of Charles in Charge (1984), where she played the character of Lila Pembroke.

Early life and career
Lerman was born in Chicago, Illinois. She began acting as a young child, appearing in the first National Tour of Annie where she played Tessie, and making her first professional screen performance in the 1982 film of the show, where she played a different character named Kate. April was then cast as Lila in the first season of Charles in Charge (1984), but the show underwent a major revamp in 1986 after being canceled in 1985 and most of the cast, including Lerman, were replaced by other actors. She spent the next few years working as an actress, appearing as a guest star in TV shows, such as Kate & Allie, Growing Pains, and Parker Lewis Can't Lose.

Personal life
April divorced attorney William Pearson Haney in 2015. She has a son with him named Sean Haney. She had attended Pepperdine University School of Law and was admitted to the California Bar in 1995 but declined to pursue a career in the legal field, saying it would have been too stressful for her. When her son was seven years old, she went back to school and received a master's degree from University of Santa Monica in Counseling Psychology. April now works in a community counseling group in Thousand Oaks, California, where she works primarily with children and adolescents.

Filmography

Soundtrack
 Annie (1982 soundtrack to film): It's The Hard-Knock Life, Sandy, Maybe (Reprise), You're Never Fully Dressed Without A Smile, Finale Medley: I Don't Need Anything But You/We Got Annie/Tomorrow.

Appearances as self

Award nominations
 1987: Nominated in the Young Artist Awards for: Exceptional Performance by a Young Actress, Guest Starring in a Television, Comedy or Drama Series for: Growing Pains (1985).
 1986: Nominated in the Young Artist Awards for: Best Young Supporting Actress in a Television Series - Charles in Charge (1984)

References

External links

 
 Annieorphans.com
 Jon Merrill's Annie movie trivia

1969 births
American child actresses
American film actresses
American television actresses
Living people
Actresses from Chicago
Pepperdine University School of Law alumni
University of Santa Monica alumni
21st-century American women